The Zăbala (in its uppermost course also: Zăbăluța) is a right tributary of the river Putna in Romania. Its source is in the Vrancea Mountains, close to the sources of the Putna, the Bâsca Mare and the Ghelința. It flows through the communes Nereju, Spulber, Paltin, Năruja. It discharges into the Putna near Valea Sării.

Tributaries

The following rivers are tributaries to the river Zăbala:

Left: Arișoaia, Măcrișu, Palcău, Țipăul Mare, Petic, Năruja
Right: Mârdanu, Goru, Căbălașu, Giurgiu, Zârna Mare, Zârna Mică

References

Rivers of Romania
Rivers of Vrancea County